The Pagan Prosperity is the second album by black metal band Old Man's Child, released on 7 October 1997. It was recorded and mixed at Studiomega in June 1997.

Track listing
All music, lyrics and arrangements by Galder.
"The Millennium King" – 5:28
"Behind the Mask" – 3:58
"Soul Possessed" – 4:04
"My Demonic Figures" – 3:59
"Doommaker" – 3:39
"My Kingdom Will Come" – 4:35
"Return of the Night Creatures" – 5:36
"What Malice Embrace" – 5:13

Credits
Galder – vocals, guitars, keyboards
Jardar – guitars
Gonde – bass
Tony Kirkemo – drums
J. Lohngrin Cremonese - Vocal tribute on "The Millennium King", "Doommaker" and "Return of the Night Creatures"

Additional personnel
 Christophe Szpajdel — logo

References

Old Man's Child albums
1997 albums
Century Media Records albums